Van Reenen is Dutch toponymic surname meaning "from/of Rhenen", a city in the province of Utrecht. Among variant forms, all pronounced the same, are Renen, Rheenen and Rhenen. Until 2006, there was a noble family . Notable people with the surname include:

Charlie van Renen (1868–1942), South African rugby player
Derek Van Rheenen (born 1964), Nigerian-born American soccer defender 
Esmari van Reenen (born 1981), South African sport shooter
Godfrey van Rhenen (died 1178), Bishop of Utrecht 1156–78
Gerlach Cornelis Joannes van Reenen (1818–1893), Dutch politician, Minister of the Interior 1853–56
John van Reenen (1947–2018), South African discus thrower
John Van Reenen (economist) (born 1965), British economist
Piet van Reenen (1909–1969), Dutch football forward

See also
Van Reenen's Pass, South African mountain passnamed after the farmer Frans van Reenen
Van Reenen, settlement on the top of that pass

References

Dutch-language surnames
Surnames of Dutch origin
Toponymic surnames